Tony Bancroft (born July 31, 1967) is an American animator and film director who frequently collaborates with Disney. He is the founder and owner of the faith-driven animation company Toonacious Family Entertainment. Tony currently serves as the Executive VP Creative Development and Production for DivideNine Animation Studios.

Life and career
A native Californian, Bancroft grew up in Orange County. After a two-year stint at Cypress College, he enrolled in the character animation program at CalArts. This led to a summer job as a production assistant with filmmaker Ralph Bakshi and ultimately to an internship in California with Disney Feature Animation followed by a full-time position at the new Florida animation facility. Bancroft (along with his twin brother Tom) was selected to be among the first group of animators to work at the Disney-MGM Studios. During his one-year stay in Florida, he had his first official assignment as an assistant clean-up animator on Roger Rabbit in Roller Coaster Rabbit (1990). This was followed by a credit as animating assistant on The Rescuers Down Under (1990) working on the character of "Frank the frill-necked lizard".

In 1990, he returned to California and worked as a character animator on Beauty and the Beast (1991) and Aladdin (1992) before being promoted to supervising animator role on The Lion King (1994). After working on the character design and some preliminary animation for the gargoyle characters in The Hunchback of Notre Dame (1996), he was tapped to join Barry Cook as a director on Mulan (1998).

He was animation supervisor on Stuart Little 2 at Sony Pictures Imageworks during 2002, and founded Toonacious that same year. Bancroft also served as English voice director on Hayao Miyazaki's Porco Rosso in 2003.

In 2012, Bancroft authored the book: Directing for Animation : Everything You Didn't Learn in Art School  published by Focal Press. The book explores the directing process, with insights from noted directors including Dean DeBlois, Pete Docter, Eric Goldberg, Tim Miller, John Musker, Jennifer Yuh Nelson, Nick Park and Chris Wedge.

In 2014, Bancroft and his brother Tom, began The Bancroft Brothers Animation Podcast, which focuses on the animation industry, featuring interviews with creators and those involved.  The podcast celebrated its 100th episode with guest Mark Henn in July 2018 live show presented via Skype, for animation classes at Lipscomb University in Tennessee, where each brother teaches.

For some time, Bancroft was working on pre-production and directing an animated film, titled Bunyan and Babe, which was released in 2017.

In March 2018, it was announced that Bancroft would join Azusa Pacific University as the head of the school's new Animation and Visual Effects degree program beginning in the fall of that year.

In 2018, Bancroft also was an animator on Mary Poppins Returns.

Bancroft is currently a storyboard artist at Warner Bros. Animation, after he was one of the traditional animators on Space Jam: A New Legacy.

Personal life
Bancroft and his wife, Rene, have three daughters, Caitlin, Savannah, and Sierra. They returned to Los Angeles after living in Florida during the production of Mulan. He has a twin brother named Tom who is also an animator.

He is a Christian, and highly credits God for his talents as an animator and director.

Filmography

Awards
 In 1998, Bancroft received the Annie Award for Outstanding Achievement in Directing, along with co-director Barry Cook for Mulan.
 In 2003, Bancroft received the Visual Effects Society Award for Best Character Animation in an Animated Motion Picture, along with David Schaub, Eric Armstrong, and Sean Mullen, for Stuart Little 2.
 In 2019, Bancroft received the Uzeta Award at the Etna International Festival of Comics and Pop Culture in Catania, Italy for Best Cross-Media Artist for The Return of Mary Poppins

References

External links
 

1967 births
American animated film directors
American animated film producers
American film producers
American identical twins
American storyboard artists
American voice directors
Animators from California
Annie Award winners
California Institute of the Arts alumni
Christians from California
Film directors from California
Living people
People from Orange County, California
Walt Disney Animation Studios people